YLM or Ylm may stand for:
 Spherical harmonics, a branch of mathematics
 Young Liberal Movement of Australia, a political party
 Youth Link Movement, a Sri Lankan community project organization
 Turu language 
 Yottalumen, a measure of light by lumen